Thomas Alexander Findlay (22 March 1918 — 27 June 2005) was a Scottish first-class cricketer.

Findlay was born in March 1918 at Rubislaw, Aberdeenshire. He was educated at Robert Gordon's College. A club cricketer for Aberdeenshire, Findlay made a single appearance in first-class cricket for Scotland against Ireland at Cork in 1947. Batting twice in the match, he was dismissed without scoring by James Boucher in the Scotland first innings, while in their second innings he was dismissed for 19 runs by Sonny Hool. Outside of cricket, he was employed by the Clydesdale and North of Scotland Bank. Findlay died at Perth in June 2005. His brother, Francis, was also a first-class cricketer.

References

External links
 

1918 births
2005 deaths
Cricketers from Aberdeen
People educated at Robert Gordon's College
Scottish cricketers